Division No. 18, Unorganized is an unorganized area in northern Saskatchewan. It consists of all of Division No. 18 excluding municipalities and reserves. It has a population of 1,641 as of 2011, and an area of 268,389.99 km2.

References

Unorganized areas in Saskatchewan
Division No. 18, Unorganized, Saskatchewan